Los Querendones (Lit: The Irresistible) is a Venezuelan telenovela created by Carlos Peréz and produced by Venevisión. The telenovela was distributed internationally by Venevisión International under the title Sueño Con Tu Amor (English title: Yearning For Your Love).

On February 14, 2006, Venevisión started broadcasting Los Querendones weekdays at 9:00pm, replacing Se solicita príncipe azul. The last episode was broadcast on July 28, 2006 with Ciudad Bendita replacing it.

Fabiola Colmenares and Jorge Reyes star as the main protagonists, while Crisol Carabal and Miguel de León star as the main antagonists.

Plot
Fe Quintero Ruiz is a Literature teacher who has been best friends with Dr. Gloria Miralles since childhood. While Fe is sweet, sociable and works hard to assist her parents with the household expenses, Gloria is a beautiful, arrogant and cold-hearted millionaire who has everything she could ask for except that she is unhappy and has a deep resentment towards her best friend with whom they affectionately call each other "monster".

One day, Fe falls madly in love with Sergio Grimán, a legal assistant who failed to finish Law school due to several family problems. Gloria's bitterness towards her friend intensifies when her mother Alicia reveals that Fe is her half-sister after she had an affair with Chon, Fe's father who previously worked for them as a chauffeur. Her hatred and envy for her friend grows everyday when she  realizes that Fe will have everything that she cannot have: half of her fortune and the love of Sergio, with whom Gloria has also developed an attraction to. She therefore develops a plan to disinherit Fe and steal away the man that she loves. Considering that her late father put a clause in his will that she can only receive her inheritance once she is married, Gloria begins the process of seducing Sergio to steal him away from her friend. The only person who is aware of her plans is Elias Grimán, a handsome young priest who tries to counsel Gloria to find it in her heart and forgive her friend. It is only later that Fr. Elias discovers that the woman Gloria has been talking about in the secrecy of confession is his brother's girlfriend and future fiance, Fe.

While Fe is happy finding the man of her dreams, the mysticism she is interested in and the tarot cards she reads tell her that impending doom is approaching to ruin her happiness. She could never guess that her enemy is her friend Gloria.

Cast

Main
Fabiola Colmenares as Fe Quintero Ruiz
Jorge Reyes as Sergio Grimán
Crisol Carabal as Gloria Miralles
Miguel de León as Valentín Alcántara
Juan Carlos Vivas as Elias Grimán
Loly Sanchez as Alicia Vda. de Miralles
José Torres as Media Chola
Roberto Lamarca as Chon Quintero
Tania Sarabia as Rafaela "Fela" Palacios
Amilcar Rivero as Inocencio Ruiz
Gigi Zanchetta as Caridad Arriechi
Karl Hoffman as Armando Montilla
Flor Elena Gonzalez as Esther Miralles
Amanda Gutiérrez as Piedad Ruiz de Quintero
Carlos Olivier as Erasmo Grimán

Supporting
Judith Vásquez as Eusebia Martínez
Reina Hinojosa as Berta Ortíz
Bebsabe Duque as Niurka Higuera
Claudia La Gatta as Milady Castillo
Reinaldo José Pérez as Pantaleón Burguillos
Jose Manuel Suárez as Luisito Arriechi
Erika Schwarzgruber as Barbarita Ortíz
Rodrigo González as Alejandrito Grimán Adriani
Joseph de Abreu as Angelucha
Henry Rodríguez
Elio Pietrini

References

External links

Venevisión telenovelas
2006 telenovelas
Venezuelan telenovelas
2006 Venezuelan television series debuts
2006 Venezuelan television series endings
Spanish-language telenovelas
Television shows set in Caracas